Prasophyllum niphopedium, commonly known as the marsh leek orchid, is a species of orchid endemic to a small area in Victoria. It has a single tubular leaf and up to twenty greenish flowers with reddish markings. It is only known from five population on grassy alpine plains with the total number of individual plants less than five hundred.

Description
The flowers are lightly scented, greenish with pink or reddish markings and as with others in the genus, are inverted so that the labellum is above the column rather than below it. The petals are linear to lance-shaped,  and curve forwards. There is a brown or green, short, channelled and wrinkled callus in the centre of the labellum. Flowering occurs from December to February.

Taxonomy and naming
Prasophyllum niphopedium was first formally described in 2000 by David Jones and the description was published in The Orchadian from a specimen collected in the Cobberas Range.

Distribution and habitat
The marsh leek orchid grows on snow plains in grassy alpine heath, usually near watercourses in the Cobberas Range and Benambra area. The number of plants fluctuates between two hundred and five hundred in five populations.

Conservation
Prasophyllum niphopedium is listed as "Endangered" under the Victorian Flora and Fauna Guarantee Act 1988 but is not listed under the Commonwealth Government Environment Protection and Biodiversity Conservation Act 1999 (EPBC) Act. The main threats to the species are soil disturbance and grazing by feral horses and cattle and inappropriate fire regimes.

References

External links 
 

niphopedium
Flora of Victoria (Australia)
Endemic orchids of Australia
Plants described in 2000